Nikoleta is female given name. Nikoleta is the female version of the Greek name Nikolaos meaning "victory" or "winner of the people".

Name Days 
Czech: 20 November
Greece: 6 December
Serbia: 6 December and 22 May
Bulgaria: 6 December

Famous bearers 
 Nicolette (musician), a UK singer/songwriter of Nigerian parentage
 Nicollette Sheridan, British actress known for her portrayal of Edie Britt on Desperate Housewives
 Nicolette Larson, American singer best known for her cover version of Neil Young's Lotta Love
 Nicolette Palikat, Malaysian singer from Tambunan, Sabah
 Nicolette Hellemans, former international rower from the Netherlands
 Nicolette "Nicki" Grant, character on the HBO series Big Love
 Nicolette Bethel, Bahamian teacher, writer and anthropologist
 Nicolette Krebitz, German actress

Nicolette as surname 
 Mike Nicolette, American professional golfer who played on the PGA Tour in the 1970s and 1980s

Fictional 
Nicolette, a 1978 album release by Nicolette Larson
 Nicolette (novel), a 1922 novel by Baroness Orczy

See also

Nicoleta
Nikoletta
 Aucassin and Nicolette, a medieval French chantefable
 DJ-Kicks: Nicolette, a DJ mix album

Greek feminine given names
Czech feminine given names
Slovak feminine given names